Kamarkhanda is an upazila of  Sirajganj District in the Rajshahi Division, Bangladesh.

Geography
It has 19181 households and total area 91.61 km2. It is bounded by Sherpur (Bogra) and Dhunat upazilas on the north, Ullahpara and Kamarkhanda upazilas on the south, Sirajganj sadar and Kamarkhanda upazilas on the east, Tarash upazila on the west.

Demographics
Par the 2001 Bangladesh census, Kamarkhanda has a population of 2,67,522; males constituted 137574 of the population, females 129948; Muslim 234112, Hindu 33361, Buddhist 30 and others 19.

As of the 1991 Bangladesh census, Kamarkhanda has a population of 105,997. Males constitute 51.81% of the population, and females 48.19%. This Upazila's eighteen up population is 51,649. Kamarkhanda has an average literacy rate of 26.2% (7+ years), and the national average of 32.4% literate.

Administration
Raiganj Thana was formed in 1937 and it was turned into an upazila in 1984.

Kamarkhanda Upazila is divided into four union parishads: Bhadraghat, Jamtail, Jhawail, and Roydaulatpur. The union parishads are subdivided into 55 mauzas and 93 villages.

See also
Upazilas of Bangladesh
Districts of Bangladesh
Divisions of Bangladesh

References

Upazilas of Sirajganj District